In Greek mythology, Olynthus was a son of Heracles and Bolbe, from whom the ancient city of Olynthus, and the river Olynthus near Apollonia, were believed to have received their name according to Athenaeus. According to Conon and  Stephanus of Byzantium, Olynthus was son of king Strymon, and brother of Brangas and Rhesus.

Mythology
After Olynthus was killed during the chase by a lion, his brother Brangas buried him on the spot where he had fallen, and called the town which he subsequently built there Olynthus.

Notes

References
 Athenaeus of Naucratis, The Deipnosophists or Banquet of the Learned. London. Henry G. Bohn, York Street, Covent Garden. 1854. Online version at the Perseus Digital Library.
 Athenaeus of Naucratis, Deipnosophistae. Kaibel. In Aedibus B.G. Teubneri. Lipsiae. 1887. Greek text available at the Perseus Digital Library.
 Conon, Fifty Narrations, surviving as one-paragraph summaries in the Bibliotheca (Library) of Photius, Patriarch of Constantinople translated from the Greek by Brady Kiesling. Online version at the Topos Text Project.
 Stephanus of Byzantium, Stephani Byzantii Ethnicorum quae supersunt, edited by August Meineike (1790-1870), published 1849. A few entries from this important ancient handbook of place names have been translated by Brady Kiesling. Online version at the Topos Text Project.

Children of Potamoi
Mythology of Macedonia (region)
Heracleidae
Children of Heracles